Live in Antwerp is a live album by German rock band Kadavar, released on 6 June 2014 by Nuclear Blast. It was their first live album and fourth album overall. The record featured live versions of 11 tracks that originally appeared on studio albums Kadavar and Abra Kadavar, performed and recorded at various live shows in Antwerp, Belgium.

Track listing

Personnel
Kadavar
Christoph Lindemann – vocals, electric guitar
Simon Bouteloup - bass
Christoph Bartelt - drums, percussion

References

External links

2014 live albums
Kadavar albums